The 2018 Canadian Grand Prix (formally known as the Formula 1 Grand Prix Heineken du Canada 2018) is a Formula One motor race that took place on 10 June 2018 at the Circuit Gilles Villeneuve in Montreal, Quebec, Canada. The race was the 7th round of the 2018 FIA Formula One World Championship. The race was won by Sebastian Vettel of Ferrari. It was Vettel's 50th career win, becoming the fourth driver in Formula One history to achieve such a feat (joining Michael Schumacher, Lewis Hamilton and Alain Prost). Fernando Alonso also celebrated his 300th Grand Prix entry at this race. This race was Ferrari's first win in Canada since Michael Schumacher won here in 2004.

Mercedes driver Lewis Hamilton went in to the race as the defending race winner. He entered the round with a 14-point lead over Sebastian Vettel in the World Drivers' Championship. In the World Constructors' Championship, Mercedes held a 17-point lead over Ferrari.

Report

Background

Tyres
The tyre compounds provided for this race were the hypersoft, ultrasoft  and supersoft.

Practice 
Max Verstappen was fastest across all three practice sessions, improving his time in each successive session. In FP2, Grosjean hit a groundhog that was on the track, damaging his front wing, and reducing the Haas team's spare parts.

Qualifying 
Romain Grosjean's car had a major engine failure as it left the pitlane in Q1 meaning he failed to set a lap time, and raced at the stewards' discretion. In Q2, when Sebastian Vettel was completing his final flying lap, he aborted the lap because Carlos Sainz, Nico Hülkenberg and a number of other cars were driving slowly along the back straight, leading him to pull into the pits. In Q3, Vettel took pole with a new track record however his teammate made a mistake in Turn 2, meaning he would qualify in P5.

Race 
The grid got away largely without incident from the line, but in turn 5, Brendon Hartley and local driver Lance Stroll collided, forcing their immediate retirement and the deployment of the safety car. At the restart, Sergio Pérez touched Sainz, forcing Pérez off the track, losing positions. On Lap 18, Daniel Ricciardo overcut Lewis Hamilton for the fourth position. On lap 43, Fernando Alonso retired from the race with an exhaust issue.

Race officials erroneously directed model Winnie Harlow to wave the chequered flag before race leader Vettel completed lap 69 (the scheduled penultimate lap) and therefore the results were taken from lap 68, according to the Formula 1 sporting regulations article 43.2. This meant that Ricciardo's successively faster laps on laps 69 and 70 were voided, and Sergio Pérez's overtake on Kevin Magnussen for 13th did not stand.

Classification

Qualifying

Notes
  – Pierre Gasly received a ten-place grid penalty for his power unit change.
  – Romain Grosjean failed to set a lap time during qualifying. He was allowed to race at the stewards' discretion.

Race

Championship standings after the race

Drivers' Championship standings

Constructors' Championship standings

 Note: Only the top five positions are included for both sets of standings.

References

External links

Canadian Grand Prix
Canadian
Grand Prix
Canadian Grand Prix
2010s in Montreal
2018 in Quebec